The 1961 Pittsburgh Pirates fell from World Champions the previous season to sixth place in the National League, as they won 75 games and lost 79, 18 games behind NL Champion Cincinnati.

Regular season

Season standings

Record vs. opponents

Game log

|- bgcolor="ccffcc"
| 1 || April 11 || @ Giants || 8–7 || Face (1–0) || McCormick || Labine (1) || 41,423 || 1–0
|- bgcolor="ffbbbb"
| 2 || April 12 || @ Giants || 1–2 || Loes || Law (0–1) || Duffalo || 7,583 || 1–1
|- bgcolor="ffbbbb"
| 3 || April 13 || @ Giants || 5–6 (12) || Duffalo || Face (1–1) || — || 10,910 || 1–2
|- bgcolor="ccffcc"
| 4 || April 14 || @ Dodgers || 6–3 || Gibbon (1–0) || Koufax || Labine (2) || 28,371 || 2–2
|- bgcolor="ccffcc"
| 5 || April 15 || @ Dodgers || 4–1 || Friend (1–0) || Drysdale || — || 36,783 || 3–2
|- bgcolor="ffbbbb"
| 6 || April 16 || @ Dodgers || 6–13 || Williams || Law (0–2) || Palmquist || 27,716 || 3–3
|- bgcolor="ccffcc"
| 7 || April 18 || Cubs || 5–3 || Mizell (1–0) || Wright || Face (1) || 30,781 || 4–3
|- bgcolor="ccffcc"
| 8 || April 19 || Cubs || 4–1 || Friend (2–0) || Anderson || — || 12,742 || 5–3
|- bgcolor="ffbbbb"
| 9 || April 20 || Cubs || 0–3 || Hobbie || Gibbon (1–1) || — || 10,428 || 5–4
|- bgcolor="ffbbbb"
| 10 || April 23 || Braves || 1–3 || Spahn || Law (0–3) || — || 21,249 || 5–5
|- bgcolor="ccffcc"
| 11 || April 24 || Braves || 7–6 || Friend (3–0) || Drabowsky || Labine (3) || 14,826 || 6–5
|- bgcolor="ccffcc"
| 12 || April 26 || Phillies || 3–2 || Mizell (2–0) || Green || — || 9,420 || 7–5
|- bgcolor="ccffcc"
| 13 || April 29 || @ Reds || 6–3 || Law (1–3) || Jay || Face (2) || 9,173 || 8–5
|- bgcolor="ccffcc"
| 14 || April 30 || @ Reds || 6–3 || Friend (4–0) || Hook || Face (3) ||  || 9–5
|- bgcolor="ffbbbb"
| 15 || April 30 || @ Reds || 2–4 || Purkey || Gibbon (1–2) || — || 11,743 || 9–6
|-

|- bgcolor="ccffcc"
| 16 || May 2 || @ Cardinals || 6–0 || Haddix (1–0) || Broglio || — || 6,549 || 10–6
|- bgcolor="ffbbbb"
| 17 || May 3 || @ Cardinals || 1–3 || Gibson || Mizell (2–1) || McDaniel || 5,611 || 10–7
|- bgcolor="ffbbbb"
| 18 || May 5 || Dodgers || 0–10 || Podres || Friend (4–1) || Farrell || 25,023 || 10–8
|- bgcolor="ccffcc"
| 19 || May 6 || Dodgers || 9–5 || Gibbon (2–2) || Craig || Face (4) || 9,736 || 11–8
|- bgcolor="ffbbbb"
| 20 || May 7 || Dodgers || 2–4 || Koufax || Witt (0–1) || Sherry || 17,363 || 11–9
|- bgcolor="ccffcc"
| 21 || May 9 || Giants || 9–6 || Haddix (2–0) || Sanford || Labine (4) || 17,250 || 12–9
|- bgcolor="ffbbbb"
| 22 || May 10 || Giants || 0–3 || McCormick || Friend (4–2) || — || 21,599 || 12–10
|- bgcolor="ccffcc"
| 23 || May 12 || Reds || 8–5 || Shantz (1–0) || Bridges || — || 20,662 || 13–10
|- bgcolor="ccffcc"
| 24 || May 13 || Reds || 13–5 || Labine (1–0) || O'Toole || — || 13,343 || 14–10
|- bgcolor="ffbbbb"
| 25 || May 14 || Reds || 1–4 || Hunt || Friend (4–3) || Brosnan || 17,459 || 14–11
|- bgcolor="ccffcc"
| 26 || May 16 || Cardinals || 2–1 || Face (2–1) || Simmons || — || 13,578 || 15–11
|- bgcolor="ccffcc"
| 27 || May 17 || Cardinals || 4–3 || Mizell (3–1) || Broglio || Face (5) || 17,691 || 16–11
|- bgcolor="ffbbbb"
| 28 || May 19 || @ Phillies || 1–4 || Mahaffey || Friend (4–4) || — || 16,035 || 16–12
|- bgcolor="ccffcc"
| 29 || May 20 || @ Phillies || 4–3 || Gibbon (3–2) || Roberts || Face (6) || 12,547 || 17–12
|- bgcolor="ccffcc"
| 30 || May 21 || @ Phillies || 13–11 || Friend (5–4) || Ferrarese || — || 9,291 || 18–12
|- bgcolor="ccffcc"
| 31 || May 22 || @ Braves || 2–1 || Haddix (3–0) || Buhl || — || 10,332 || 19–12
|- bgcolor="ffbbbb"
| 32 || May 23 || @ Braves || 0–1 || Burdette || Shantz (1–1) || — || 9,367 || 19–13
|- bgcolor="ccffcc"
| 33 || May 24 || @ Cubs || 7–3 || Mizell (4–1) || Ellsworth || Labine (5) || 5,573 || 20–13
|- bgcolor="ffbbbb"
| 34 || May 26 || @ Cardinals || 2–12 || Simmons || Friend (5–5) || — || 8,868 || 20–14
|- bgcolor="ffbbbb"
| 35 || May 27 || @ Cardinals || 5–7 || Broglio || Law (1–4) || McDaniel || 14,941 || 20–15
|- bgcolor="ffbbbb"
| 36 || May 28 || @ Cardinals || 4–8 || Cicotte || Haddix (3–1) || — || 16,632 || 20–16
|- bgcolor="ffbbbb"
| 37 || May 30 || Cubs || 3–5 || Ellsworth || Mizell (4–2) || Elston ||  || 20–17
|- bgcolor="ffbbbb"
| 38 || May 30 || Cubs || 0–10 || Cardwell || Friend (5–6) || — || 30,852 || 20–18
|- bgcolor="ccffcc"
| 39 || May 31 || Braves || 9–1 || Gibbon (4–2) || Spahn || — || 16,902 || 21–18
|-

|- bgcolor="ccffcc"
| 40 || June 1 || Braves || 8–2 (7) || Haddix (4–1) || Burdette || — || 19,128 || 22–18
|- bgcolor="ffbbbb"
| 41 || June 2 || Phillies || 0–6 || Buzhardt || Friend (5–7) || — || 14,344 || 22–19
|- bgcolor="ccffcc"
| 42 || June 3 || Phillies || 5–1 || Shantz (2–1) || Mahaffey || Face (7) || 11,153 || 23–19
|- bgcolor="ffbbbb"
| 43 || June 4 || Phillies || 0–5 || Ferrarese || Mizell (4–3) || — || 27,352 || 23–20
|- bgcolor="ccffcc"
| 44 || June 5 || @ Dodgers || 5–2 || Law (2–4) || Perranoski || Face (8) || 14,715 || 24–20
|- bgcolor="ffbbbb"
| 45 || June 6 || @ Dodgers || 7–8 || Podres || Face (2–2) || Sherry || 15,784 || 24–21
|- bgcolor="ffbbbb"
| 46 || June 7 || @ Dodgers || 3–7 || Koufax || Francis (0–1) || — || 19,967 || 24–22
|- bgcolor="ccffcc"
| 47 || June 8 || @ Dodgers || 4–2 || Friend (6–7) || Williams || Shantz (1) || 17,599 || 25–22
|- bgcolor="ffbbbb"
| 48 || June 9 || @ Giants || 6–9 || Bolin || Face (2–3) || Miller || 27,815 || 25–23
|- bgcolor="ffbbbb"
| 49 || June 10 || @ Giants || 0–5 || McCormick || Mizell (4–4) || — || 26,630 || 25–24
|- bgcolor="ccffcc"
| 50 || June 11 || @ Giants || 8–4 || Law (3–4) || Loes || Friend (1) || 34,185 || 26–24
|- bgcolor="ccffcc"
| 51 || June 13 || Reds || 2–1 || Gibbon (5–2) || Maloney || — || 19,423 || 27–24
|- bgcolor="ccffcc"
| 52 || June 14 || Reds || 5–4 || Shantz (3–1) || Brosnan || — || 14,270 || 28–24
|- bgcolor="ffbbbb"
| 53 || June 15 || Reds || 1–8 || Jay || Mizell (4–5) || — || 19,209 || 28–25
|- bgcolor="ffbbbb"
| 54 || June 16 || Cardinals || 2–5 || Gibson || Haddix (4–2) || — || 26,229 || 28–26
|- bgcolor="ccffcc"
| 55 || June 17 || Cardinals || 9–3 || Shantz (4–1) || Broglio || — || 15,436 || 29–26
|- bgcolor="ccffcc"
| 56 || June 18 || Cardinals || 5–3 || Friend (7–7) || Simmons || Face (9) ||  || 30–26
|- bgcolor="ffbbbb"
| 57 || June 18 || Cardinals || 3–7 || Jackson || Gibbon (5–3) || Miller || 29,176 || 30–27
|- bgcolor="ccffcc"
| 58 || June 20 || @ Phillies || 6–2 || Haddix (5–2) || Mahaffey || Face (10) || 10,649 || 31–27
|- bgcolor="ccffcc"
| 59 || June 22 || @ Phillies || 5–1 || Friend (8–7) || Buzhardt || — || 9,126 || 32–27
|- bgcolor="ffbbbb"
| 60 || June 23 || Phillies || 11–12 || Lehman || Francis (0–2) || Sullivan || 16,170 || 32–28
|- bgcolor="ffbbbb"
| 61 || June 24 || Phillies || 2–6 || Short || Mizell (4–6) || Sullivan || 9,546 || 32–29
|- bgcolor="ccffcc"
| 62 || June 25 || Phillies || 10–5 || Face (3–3) || Baldschun || — ||  || 33–29
|- bgcolor="ffbbbb"
| 63 || June 25 || Phillies || 3–4 || Mahaffey || Haddix (5–3) || Sullivan || 10,951 || 33–30
|- bgcolor="ffbbbb"
| 64 || June 27 || Dodgers || 5–9 || Farrell || Friend (8–8) || Sherry || 25,936 || 33–31
|- bgcolor="ccffcc"
| 65 || June 28 || Dodgers || 9–3 || Gibbon (6–3) || Drysdale || — || 21,581 || 34–31
|- bgcolor="ccffcc"
| 66 || June 29 || Dodgers || 4–2 || Francis (1–2) || Koufax || Face (11) || 21,520 || 35–31
|- bgcolor="ccffcc"
| 67 || June 30 || Giants || 4–3 || Face (4–3) || McCormick || — || 31,900 || 36–31
|-

|- bgcolor="ffbbbb"
| 68 || July 1 || Giants || 3–4 || Jones || Friend (8–9) || — || 19,737 || 36–32
|- bgcolor="ccffcc"
| 69 || July 2 || Giants || 7–6 || Haddix (6–3) || McCormick || Labine (6) ||  || 37–32
|- bgcolor="ccffcc"
| 70 || July 2 || Giants || 9–0 (7) || Shantz (5–1) || Marichal || — || 36,093 || 38–32
|- bgcolor="ffbbbb"
| 71 || July 3 || @ Reds || 3–4 || Maloney || Gibbon (6–4) || Brosnan || 31,839 || 38–33
|- bgcolor="ffbbbb"
| 72 || July 4 || @ Reds || 0–2 || Jay || Francis (1–3) || — || 11,802 || 38–34
|- bgcolor="ccffcc"
| 73 || July 6 || @ Cubs || 15–3 || Friend (9–9) || Ellsworth || — ||  || 39–34
|- bgcolor="ffbbbb"
| 74 || July 6 || @ Cubs || 1–5 || Hobbie || Mizell (4–7) || — || 15,813 || 39–35
|- bgcolor="ccffcc"
| 75 || July 7 || @ Braves || 6–5 || McBean (1–0) || Spahn || Face (12) || 17,622 || 40–35
|- bgcolor="ccffcc"
| 76 || July 8 || @ Braves || 4–3 || Gibbon (7–4) || Buhl || Shantz (2) || 16,109 || 41–35
|- bgcolor="ccffcc"
| 77 || July 9 || @ Braves || 5–4 || McBean (2–0) || Burdette || Face (13) || 20,845 || 42–35
|- bgcolor="ffbbbb"
| 78 || July 13 || @ Giants || 1–2 || Miller || Friend (9–10) || — || 11,328 || 42–36
|- bgcolor="ccffcc"
| 79 || July 14 || @ Giants || 6–4 || Labine (2–0) || LeMay || Face (14) || 23,177 || 43–36
|- bgcolor="ffbbbb"
| 80 || July 15 || @ Giants || 3–8 || McCormick || Haddix (6–4) || — || 22,596 || 43–37
|- bgcolor="ffbbbb"
| 81 || July 16 || @ Dodgers || 11–12 (10) || Podres || Face (4–4) || — || 15,930 || 43–38
|- bgcolor="ffbbbb"
| 82 || July 17 || @ Dodgers || 4–6 || Williams || Friend (9–11) || Koufax || 26,232 || 43–39
|- bgcolor="ccffcc"
| 83 || July 20 || Cubs || 4–0 || Gibbon (8–4) || Curtis || — || 13,859 || 44–39
|- bgcolor="ffbbbb"
| 84 || July 21 || Braves || 3–5 || Burdette || Friend (9–12) || Nottebart || 28,290 || 44–40
|- bgcolor="ffbbbb"
| 85 || July 22 || Braves || 4–5 || Cloninger || Shantz (5–2) || Nottebart || 16,417 || 44–41
|- bgcolor="ffbbbb"
| 86 || July 23 || Braves || 4–11 || Buhl || Haddix (6–5) || — ||  || 44–42
|- bgcolor="ffbbbb"
| 87 || July 23 || Braves || 4–5 || McMahon || Friend (9–13) || — || 26,531 || 44–43
|- bgcolor="ffbbbb"
| 88 || July 25 || Giants || 7–16 || Miller || Gibbon (8–5) || — || 18,698 || 44–44
|- bgcolor="ccffcc"
| 89 || July 26 || Giants || 8–3 || Friend (10–13) || LeMay || — || 17,306 || 45–44
|- bgcolor="ffbbbb"
| 90 || July 27 || Giants || 0–2 || Marichal || Mizell (4–8) || — || 17,885 || 45–45
|- bgcolor="ffbbbb"
| 91 || July 28 || Dodgers || 4–6 || Podres || Francis (1–4) || Farrell || 25,593 || 45–46
|- bgcolor="ffbbbb"
| 92 || July 29 || Dodgers || 4–5 || Perranoski || McBean (2–1) || Farrell || 11,822 || 45–47
|- bgcolor="ffbbbb"
| 93 || July 30 || Dodgers || 3–7 || Drysdale || Gibbon (8–6) || Perranoski || 18,273 || 45–48
|-

|- bgcolor="ffbbbb"
| 94 || August 2 || @ Cardinals || 2–4 || Jackson || Shantz (5–3) || — || 12,048 || 45–49
|- bgcolor="ccffcc"
| 95 || August 3 || @ Cardinals || 19–0 || Haddix (7–5) || Cicotte || — || 11,514 || 46–49
|- bgcolor="ffbbbb"
| 96 || August 4 || @ Reds || 4–5 || Brosnan || Labine (2–1) || — || 27,383 || 46–50
|- bgcolor="ccffcc"
| 97 || August 5 || @ Reds || 11–7 || McBean (3–1) || Hunt || — || 12,125 || 47–50
|- bgcolor="ccffcc"
| 98 || August 6 || @ Reds || 9–4 || Mizell (5–8) || Jay || Labine (7) ||  || 48–50
|- bgcolor="ffbbbb"
| 99 || August 6 || @ Reds || 2–3 (10) || Brosnan || Face (4–5) || — || 31,167 || 48–51
|- bgcolor="ccffcc"
| 100 || August 7 || @ Phillies || 3–1 || Friend (11–13) || Buzhardt || — || 5,586 || 49–51
|- bgcolor="ccffcc"
| 101 || August 8 || @ Phillies || 10–2 || Haddix (8–5) || Mahaffey || — ||  || 50–51
|- bgcolor="ccffcc"
| 102 || August 8 || @ Phillies || 3–2 || Sturdivant (1–0) || Short || — || 11,081 || 51–51
|- bgcolor="ffbbbb"
| 103 || August 9 || Cardinals || 0–4 || Simmons || Gibbon (8–7) || Bauta || 17,038 || 51–52
|- bgcolor="ffbbbb"
| 104 || August 10 || Cardinals || 2–3 || Sadecki || Francis (1–5) || — || 13,812 || 51–53
|- bgcolor="ccffcc"
| 105 || August 11 || Phillies || 6–0 (7) || Friend (12–13) || Roberts || — || 12,965 || 52–53
|- bgcolor="ccffcc"
| 106 || August 12 || Phillies || 4–0 || Mizell (6–8) || Owens || — || 8,785 || 53–53
|- bgcolor="ccffcc"
| 107 || August 13 || Phillies || 13–4 || Sturdivant (2–0) || Buzhardt || — || 12,923 || 54–53
|- bgcolor="ffbbbb"
| 108 || August 14 || @ Braves || 3–8 || Cloninger || Haddix (8–6) || — || 14,648 || 54–54
|- bgcolor="ffbbbb"
| 109 || August 15 || @ Braves || 1–4 || Willey || Gibbon (8–8) || — || 16,843 || 54–55
|- bgcolor="ffbbbb"
| 110 || August 16 || @ Braves || 1–2 || Spahn || Friend (12–14) || — || 18,330 || 54–56
|- bgcolor="ffbbbb"
| 111 || August 17 || @ Cubs || 4–11 || Drott || Mizell (6–9) || Anderson ||  || 54–57
|- bgcolor="ccffcc"
| 112 || August 17 || @ Cubs || 4–3 || Francis (2–5) || Brewer || Face (15) || 16,961 || 55–57
|- bgcolor="ffbbbb"
| 113 || August 18 || @ Cubs || 1–2 (11) || Ellsworth || Sturdivant (2–1) || — || 7,469 || 55–58
|- bgcolor="ccffcc"
| 114 || August 19 || @ Cubs || 4–3 (11) || Labine (3–1) || Curtis || — || 11,777 || 56–58
|- bgcolor="ffbbbb"
| 115 || August 20 || @ Cubs || 0–1 (11) || Cardwell || Friend (12–15) || — || 19,038 || 56–59
|- bgcolor="ccffcc"
| 116 || August 22 || Braves || 4–1 || Gibbon (9–8) || Buhl || Face (16) || 15,874 || 57–59
|- bgcolor="ccffcc"
| 117 || August 23 || Braves || 7–6 || Face (5–5) || Nottebart || — || 15,117 || 58–59
|- bgcolor="ffbbbb"
| 118 || August 24 || Braves || 1–6 || Spahn || Friend (12–16) || — || 16,653 || 58–60
|- bgcolor="ccffcc"
| 119 || August 25 || Cubs || 1–0 || Sturdivant (3–1) || Cardwell || — || 12,651 || 59–60
|- bgcolor="ffbbbb"
| 120 || August 26 || Cubs || 3–7 || Schultz || Face (5–6) || Anderson || 9,137 || 59–61
|- bgcolor="ccffcc"
| 121 || August 27 || Cubs || 7–3 || Gibbon (10–8) || Curtis || Labine (8) ||  || 60–61
|- bgcolor="ffbbbb"
| 122 || August 27 || Cubs || 5–6 || Brewer || Mizell (6–10) || Anderson || 15,471 || 60–62
|- bgcolor="ffbbbb"
| 123 || August 28 || Cubs || 4–5 || Anderson || Face (5–7) || — || 13,753 || 60–63
|- bgcolor="ffbbbb"
| 124 || August 29 || Reds || 0–3 || O'Toole || Friend (12–17) || Maloney || 17,999 || 60–64
|- bgcolor="ccffcc"
| 125 || August 30 || Reds || 3–1 || Sturdivant (4–1) || Purkey || — || 20,000 || 61–64
|-

|- bgcolor="ffbbbb"
| 126 || September 1 || @ Cardinals || 4–8 || Jackson || Gibbon (10–9) || — || 13,480 || 61–65
|- bgcolor="ccffcc"
| 127 || September 2 || @ Cardinals || 5–4 || Face (6–7) || McDaniel || — || 9,140 || 62–65
|- bgcolor="ccffcc"
| 128 || September 3 || @ Cardinals || 8–1 || Friend (13–17) || Simmons || — || 13,817 || 63–65
|- bgcolor="ffbbbb"
| 129 || September 4 || @ Cardinals || 4–9 || Sadecki || Francis (2–6) || McDaniel || 10,021 || 63–66
|- bgcolor="ccffcc"
| 130 || September 5 || @ Cubs || 8–3 || Sturdivant (5–1) || Hobbie || — || 3,417 || 64–66
|- bgcolor="ffbbbb"
| 131 || September 6 || @ Cubs || 2–6 || Cardwell || Gibbon (10–10) || — || 3,080 || 64–67
|- bgcolor="ccffcc"
| 132 || September 7 || @ Cubs || 7–5 || Shantz (6–3) || Brewer || — || 2,752 || 65–67
|- bgcolor="ccffcc"
| 133 || September 8 || @ Braves || 2–1 || Friend (14–17) || Hendley || — || 15,606 || 66–67
|- bgcolor="ffbbbb"
| 134 || September 9 || @ Braves || 3–4 || Nottebart || Face (6–8) || — || 12,320 || 66–68
|- bgcolor="ffbbbb"
| 135 || September 10 || @ Braves || 3–4 || Spahn || Sturdivant (5–2) || — || 24,198 || 66–69
|- bgcolor="ffbbbb"
| 136 || September 11 || @ Giants || 3–4 (10) || Sanford || Face (6–9) || — || 5,512 || 66–70
|- bgcolor="ccffcc"
| 137 || September 12 || @ Giants || 3–0 || Gibbon (11–10) || McCormick || — || 9,539 || 67–70
|- bgcolor="ccffcc"
| 138 || September 13 || @ Dodgers || 8–2 || Haddix (9–6) || Farrell || — || 10,494 || 68–70
|- bgcolor="ffbbbb"
| 139 || September 14 || @ Dodgers || 6–7 || Roebuck || Face (6–10) || — || 9,805 || 68–71
|- bgcolor="ffbbbb"
| 140 || September 16 || Cardinals || 3–6 || Sadecki || Francis (2–7) || — || 6,830 || 68–72
|- bgcolor="ffbbbb"
| 141 || September 17 || Cardinals || 0–3 || Jackson || McBean (3–2) || — || 10,030 || 68–73
|- bgcolor="ccffcc"
| 142 || September 18 || Cardinals || 8–6 || Foss (1–0) || Gibson || Face (17) || 8,934 || 69–73
|- bgcolor="ffbbbb"
| 143 || September 19 || @ Reds || 1–10 || O'Toole || Friend (14–18) || — || 14,225 || 69–74
|- bgcolor="ffbbbb"
| 144 || September 20 || @ Reds || 2–3 || Jay || Face (6–11) || — || 14,822 || 69–75
|- bgcolor="ccffcc"
| 145 || September 22 || @ Phillies || 6–3 || Labine (4–1) || Sullivan || — || 4,687 || 70–75
|- bgcolor="ffbbbb"
| 146 || September 23 || @ Phillies || 4–5 (16) || Baldschun || Face (6–12) || — || 4,005 || 70–76
|- bgcolor="ccffcc"
| 147 || September 24 || @ Phillies || 4–3 || Mizell (7–10) || Short || Sturdivant (1) || 3,282 || 71–76
|- bgcolor="ffbbbb"
| 148 || September 26 || Dodgers || 3–5 || Williams || Friend (14–19) || Farrell ||  || 71–77
|- bgcolor="ccffcc"
| 149 || September 26 || Dodgers || 8–0 || Gibbon (12–10) || Drysdale || — || 9,602 || 72–77
|- bgcolor="ccffcc"
| 150 || September 27 || Giants || 5–3 || Haddix (10–6) || Miller || — || 7,471 || 73–77
|- bgcolor="ffbbbb"
| 151 || September 28 || Giants || 4–7 || Duffalo || Francis (2–8) || Miller || 5,384 || 73–78
|- bgcolor="ffbbbb"
| 152 || September 29 || Reds || 1–8 || O'Toole || Foss (1–1) || Jones || 10,119 || 73–79
|- bgcolor="ccffcc"
| 153 || September 30 || Reds || 11–6 || Jackson (1–0) || Jay || — || 7,158 || 74–79
|-

|- bgcolor="ccffcc"
| 154 || October 1 || Reds || 3–1 || Gibbon (13–10) || Brosnan || — || 26,760 || 75–79
|-

|-
| Legend:       = Win       = LossBold = Pirates team member

Opening Day lineup

Notable transactions 
 May 1961: Don Williams was purchased from the Pirates by the Chicago White Sox.
 June 20, 1961: Gene Baker was released by the Pirates.
 June 24, 1961: Ron Woods was signed by the Pirates as an amateur free agent.

Roster

Statistics
Batting
Note: G = Games played; AB = At bats; H = Hits; Avg. = Batting average; HR = Home runs; RBI = Runs batted in

Pitching
Note: G = Games pitched; IP = Innings pitched; W = Wins; L = Losses; ERA = Earned run average; SO = Strikeouts

Farm system

LEAGUE CHAMPIONS: Asheville, Hobbs

Notes

References 
 1961 Pittsburgh Pirates team page at Baseball Reference
 1961 Pittsburgh Pirates Page at Baseball Almanac

Pittsburgh Pirates seasons
Pittsburgh Pirates season
Pittsburg